Milteliphaster is a genus of echinoderms belonging to the family Goniasteridae.

Species:

Milteliphaster regenerator 
Milteliphaster spinosus 
Milteliphaster wanganellensis 
Milteliphaster woodmasoni

References

Goniasteridae
Asteroidea genera